MCR may refer to:

Music 
 Modena City Ramblers, an Italian folk rock band
 My Chemical Romance, an American rock band

Organisations 
 Maryport and Carlisle Railway, M&CR, a pre-grouping British railway company
 Midland Counties Railway, an early British railway company
 Muslim Community Radio, a radio station based in London, UK
 Middle common room, a postgraduate student organization
 Marine Commando Regiment, Canada
 Romandy Citizens' Movement (French: Mouvement Citoyens Romand), Swiss political party

Science 
 Methyl coenzyme M reductase, an enzyme that occurs in methanogenic archea
 Micro Carbon Residue, a petroleum industry test
 Mineralocorticoid receptor, a protein
 Multi-component reaction, chemical reaction
 Mutual Climatic Range, for determining past climate at an archaeological site

Technology 
 Move to Coprocessor from Register, an ARM architecture CPU instruction
 Critical Mach number (Mcr), in aeronautics
 Maximum continuous rating, of a generating station
 Multi-component refrigerant
 Monitor Console Routine, of RSX-11 operating system

Other 
 Medical care ratio, a healthcare metric
 Master control room, a room for routing all incoming and outgoing signals
 Master of Clinical Research, an academic degree
 Mahjong Competition Rules

See also